Eszter Bánffy,  (born 1957) is a Hungarian prehistorian, archaeologist, and academic. Since 2013, she has been Director of the Romano-Germanic Commission at the German Archaeological Institute. She is also a professor at the Archaeological Institute of the Hungarian Academy of Sciences.

Honours
On 9 April 2015, Bánffy was elected a Fellow of the Society of Antiquaries of London. In 2017, she was elected a Corresponding Fellow of the British Academy (FBA), the United Kingdom's national academy for the humanities and social sciences. She is also an elected Member of the European Academy of Sciences and Arts.

Selected works

References

External links
 :de:Eszter Bánffy

1957 births
Living people
British women archaeologists
Prehistorians
Hungarian archaeologists
Hungarian women archaeologists
German Archaeological Institute
Fellows of the Society of Antiquaries of London
Corresponding Fellows of the British Academy
Members of the European Academy of Sciences and Arts